Turner Elson (born September 13, 1992) is a Canadian professional ice hockey forward for the Hartford Wolf Pack of the American Hockey League (AHL) while under contract to the New York Rangers of the National Hockey League (NHL). Undrafted, he has previously played in the NHL with the Calgary Flames and Detroit Red Wings.

Playing career
An undrafted player, Elson played junior hockey with the Red Deer Rebels of the Western Hockey League (WHL) and joined the Flames organization as a free agent signing in 2011.

Elson spent the majority of his first four professional seasons in the American Hockey League (AHL) with the Abbotsford Heat, Adirondack Flames and Stockton Heat. He was recalled to Calgary for the team's final game of the 2015–16 NHL season and made his NHL debut on April 9, 2016.  Elson recorded his first NHL point, an assist, in the 2–1 victory over the Minnesota Wild.

At the conclusion of the season and at the end of his entry-level contract, Elson was not qualified by the Flames and was released as a free agent. On July 1, 2016, he signed a one-year, two-way contract to join the Colorado Avalanche. During the 2016–17 season, after attending the Avalanche training camp he was reassigned to AHL affiliate, the San Antonio Rampage. His season was quickly derailed as he was injured after just four games with a lower body injury. He returned in the final stretches of the season registering three points in just 13 games.

On June 26, 2017, Elson again a restricted free agent, was not tendered a qualifying contract by the Colorado Avalanche, thus ending his one-year tenure with club in releasing him to free agency. On July 1, 2017, Elson signed a one-year contract with the Detroit Red Wings. On September 25, 2017, Elson was assigned to the Red Wings' AHL affiliate, the Grand Rapids Griffins.

During the 2017–18 season, Elson registered nine goals and 12 assists in 57 games for the Griffins. On June 18, 2018, Elson signed a one-year contract extension with the Griffins.

In the 2018–19 season, Elson regained his scoring touch with the Griffins. Having eclipsed his previous seasons totals, and while placing fourth in team scoring, Elson was signed mid-season to a two-year contract by the Red Wings on February 5, 2019.

Establishing himself as a valued veteran presence with the Grand Rapids Griffins, Elson was re-signed to return for a fourth season with the club, agreeing to a one-year, two-way contract extension with the Red Wings on September 27, 2020.

On July 30, 2021, Elson signed a one-year AHL contract with the Grand Rapids Griffins. In the 2021–22 season, Elson placed fourth in team scoring in contributing career best marks with 21 goals and 24 assists for 45 points through 73 games. Unable to help the Griffins qualify for the post-season, Elson was signed for the remainder of the 2021–22 season to a contract with the Detroit Red Wings on April 25, 2022.

As a free agent from the Red Wings, Elson was signed to a two-year, two-way contract with the New York Rangers on July 15, 2022.

Career statistics

References

External links
 

1992 births
Living people
Abbotsford Heat players
Adirondack Flames players
Alaska Aces (ECHL) players
Calgary Flames players
Canadian ice hockey centres
Detroit Red Wings players
Grand Rapids Griffins players
Hartford Wolf Pack players
Sportspeople from New Westminster
Red Deer Rebels players
San Antonio Rampage players
Stockton Heat players
Undrafted National Hockey League players